Kyaw Zwar Minn ( U Kyaw Zwar Minn) is a Burmese diplomat who is serving as Ambassador of Myanmar to the United Kingdom, and non-resident Ambassador to Sweden, Ireland and Denmark since 2013.

In response to the coup d'état carried out in Myanmar on 1st February 2021, Ambassador Kyaw Zwar Minn publicly demanded, on 8 March, the release of State Counsellor Aung San Suu Kyi and President Win Myint with denying the legitimacy of the junta's rule. Myanmar recalled Kyaw Zwar Minn on 9 March 2021, after he publicly called for the release of jailed State Counsellor Aung San Suu Kyi. He refused to return to Myanmar citing safety concerns. On 7 April 2021, Minn was locked out of the Embassy of Myanmar in London. British Foreign Secretary Dominic Raab condemned the "bullying actions of the Myanmar military regime", but the Foreign Office has stated that it "must accept the decision taken by the Myanmar regime".

He previously served as Burmese Ambassador to France, and non-resident Ambassador to Andorra, Spain and Switzerland.

References

1958 births
Living people
Ambassadors of Myanmar to Andorra
Ambassadors of Myanmar to Denmark
Ambassadors of Myanmar to France
Ambassadors of Myanmar to Ireland
Ambassadors of Myanmar to Spain
Ambassadors of Myanmar to Sweden
Ambassadors of Myanmar to Switzerland
Ambassadors of Myanmar to the United Kingdom
Burmese diplomats